Sulice may refer to:

 Sulice (Srebrenica), Bosnia and Herzegovina
 Sulice, Czech Republic
 Sulice, Poland